The  is a regional railway line in Shiga Prefecture operated by the private railway operator Ohmi Railway. It connects the cities of Maibara and Koka. Its alignment is parallel with the Tōkaidō Shinkansen between Takamiya and Gokasho.

The line connects with the JR Central Tōkaidō Main Line and Tōkaidō Shinkansen, and the JR West Hokuriku Main Line and Biwako Line at Maibara, and the JR West Kusatsu Line and the Shigaraki Kōgen Railway Shigaraki Line at Kibukawa.

History
The Hikone to Yokaichi section opened in 1898, reaching Kibukawa in 1900. The Hikone to Takamiya section was electrified at 600 V DC in 1925, with the Takamiya to Kibukawa section electrified at 1,500 V DC in 1928, and the Hikone to Takamiya section raised to that voltage at the same time. The Hikone to Maibara section opened in 1931 following the construction of the 340 m Sawayama Tunnel, electrified from opening.

Transport of postal items ceased in 1984, and freight services ceased in 1988.

Rapid train services were introduced in 2003, but were discontinued in 2013.

Timeline

 11 June 1898: Line opened between Hikone and Echigawa via Takamiya.
 24 July 1898: Line opened between Echigawa and Yokaichi.
 19 March 1899: Toyosato and Obata Stations opened.
 1 October 1900: Line opened between Yokaichi and Hino via Sakuragawa.
 28 December 1900: Line opened between Hino and Kibukawa via Minakuchi. Asahino station opened.
 20 May 1901: Shinmachi Station opened.
 1 January 1910: Obata Station renamed Gokasho Station.
 1 June 1911: Amago Station opened.
 16 October 1916: Asahi Otsuka Station opened.
 27 December 1916: Nagatanino Station opened.
 1 January 1917: Shinmachi Station renamed Hikoneguchi Station.
 12 March 1925: Line was electrified between Hikone and Takamiya.
 18 April 1928: Line was electrified between Takamiya and Kibukawa.
 15 March 1931: Electrified line opened between Hikone and Maibara via Toriimoto.
 1 August 1957: Minakuchi Ishibashi Station opened.
 1 May 1987: Driver-only operation commenced.
 5 April 1989: Minakuchi Matsuo and Minakuchi Jonan Stations opened.
 29 March 1990: Daigaku-mae Station opened.
 16 March 1991: Kyocera-mae Station opened.
 13 March 2004: Kawabe-no-mori Station opened.
 18 March 2006: Fujitec-mae Station opened.
 8 April 2009: Hikone-Serikawa Station opened.

Stations
Local trains stop at all stations.

See also
 List of railway lines in Japan

References
This article incorporates material from the corresponding article in the Japanese Wikipedia.

Rail transport in Shiga Prefecture
Railway lines in Japan
1067 mm gauge railways in Japan
Ohmi Railway